Gamma Leonis (γ Leonis, abbreviated Gamma Leo, γ Leo), also named Algieba , is a binary star system in the constellation of Leo. In 2009, a planetary companion around the primary was announced.

Nomenclature

γ Leonis (Latinised to Gamma Leonis) is the star's Bayer designation. The A and B components of the binary are often referred to as γ1 Leonis and γ2 Leonis, respectively.

It also bore the traditional name Algieba or Al Gieba, which originated from the Arabic الجبهة Al-Jabhah, meaning 'the forehead' (despite this meaning, the star actually appears in the mane of Leo). In 2016, the International Astronomical Union organized a Working Group on Star Names (WGSN) to catalog and standardize proper names for stars. The WGSN's first bulletin of July 2016 included a table of the first two batches of names approved by the WGSN, which included Algieba for this star.

The star's traditional Latin name was Juba. It is known as 軒轅十二 (the Twelfth Star of Xuanyuan) in Chinese (Xuanyuan is the name of the Yellow Emperor).

Algieba, along with Zeta Leonis, Regulus, Mu Leonis, Epsilon Leonis and Eta Leonis, have collectively been called the Sickle, which is an asterism that marks the head of Leo.

Stellar system
The bright binary system in Leo with orange-red and yellow or greenish-yellow components is visible through a modest telescope under good atmospheric conditions. To the naked eye, the Algieba system shines at mid-second magnitude, but a telescope easily splits the pair. The brighter component has an apparent magnitude of +2.28 and is of spectral class K1-IIIbCN-0.5. The companion star has an apparent magnitude of +3.51 and belongs to the spectral class G7IIICN-I. The giant G star has a temperature of 4,980 K, a luminosity of 50 times that of the Sun, and a diameter 10 times that of the Sun. Because the orbital period is so long, only a fraction of the full path has been observed since discovery.

Both stars are almost certainly true giants, meaning that they have stopped fusing hydrogen to helium in their cores and have expanded to great proportions. Although there has been too little observation of their orbit to calculate their masses, comparison with evolutionary calculations suggests that each are about double the mass of the Sun. Originating from the same interstellar cloud some two billion years ago, the stars have iron contents about a third that of the Sun. It is hard to tell how far along they might be in their life cycle. They both may be fusing helium in their cores, or they could be giants in development, with quiet helium cores that are waiting to fire up. The chemical composition at the surface, which is influenced by age, suggests the former.

Variability
γ Leonis is a suspected variable star, with a visual magnitude range of 1.84 to 2.03. It is not known which of the two components is variable. In 1959, the star was mistakenly published as an eclipsing binary due to a typographical error when referring to Y Leonis.

Planetary system
On November 6, 2009, the discovery of a planetary companion around primary star γ1 Leonis (γ Leonis A) was announced. The radial velocity measurements suggest two additional periodicities of 8.5 and 1,340 days. The former is likely due to stellar pulsation, whereas the latter could be indicative of the presence of an additional planetary companion with 2.14 Jupiter masses, moderate eccentricity (e=0.13) and located at 2.6 AU away from the giant star. Nevertheless, the nature of such a signal is still unclear and further investigations are needed to confirm or rule out an additional substellar companion.

References

External links
 Algieba at Jim Kaler's Stars
 Astronomical Reference from Author David Darling

Leo (constellation)
Leonis, Gamma
Leonis, 41
Binary stars
Planetary systems with one confirmed planet
Algieba
K-type giants
G-type giants
4057
089484
050583
BD+20 2467
Suspected variables